David Hummer Rowe is an American politician from Pennsylvania. He is a member of the Republican Party and has represented the 85th District in the Pennsylvania House of Representatives since 2019.

Early life
David Hummer Rowe was homeschooled and graduated in 2009. After graduating from homeschool, Rowe was a Christian missionary in Southeast Asia. While based in Taiwan, Rowe attended National Sun Yat-sen University (NSYSU), but has not disclosed whether he completed any specific program during his NSYSU experience.  After returning to the states in 2010, Rowe established LBG Fitness Inc., a CrossFit gym.

Political career
The East Buffalo Township Board of Supervisors selected Rowe to succeed Michael Daniloff in March 2018. 

After Fred Keller vacated his seat in the Pennsylvania House of Representatives District 85 on May 24, 2019, Rowe contested the open seat. This necessitated Rowe's resignation from his East Buffalo Township post, in which he was succeeded by Jim Murphy. Rowe secured the Republican Party nomination, and defeated Democratic Party candidate Jennifer Rager-Kay, as well as write-in candidate Clair Moyer. 

Rowe was sworn in as a member of the Pennsylvania House on September 17, 2019. 

In January 2020, Rowe announced that he would seek reelection. No opposing candidate filed by the deadline to challenge Rowe's incumbency. He defeated Democratic Party candidate Katie Evans in the 2020 general election with a winning vote percentage of 68.2 percent vs 31.8 percent, within one percentage point of the Republican/Democratic affiliation breakdown of the 85th district.

Rowe has blocked individuals who criticize or question his statements and policies on social media. During the COVID-19 pandemic, Rowe posted a photo on social media Thanksgiving Eve with a drink in hand after 5 P.M. as a response to COVID state-level mitigation techniques.

In 2020, Rowe was among twenty-six Pennsylvania House Republicans who called for the reversal of Joe Biden's certification as the winner of Pennsylvania's electoral votes in the 2020 United States presidential election, citing false claims of election irregularities.

Rowe is the vice-chair of the Pennsylvania State Freedom Caucus.

Electoral history

References

Year of birth missing (living people)
Living people
21st-century American politicians
Republican Party members of the Pennsylvania House of Representatives
Businesspeople from Pennsylvania
People from Union County, Pennsylvania
County officials in Pennsylvania
21st-century American businesspeople
American expatriates in Taiwan
Christian missionaries in Taiwan
American Christian missionaries
National Sun Yat-sen University alumni
21st-century American educators